Lawrence Curtis Demic (born June 27, 1957) is an American former professional basketball player for the New York Knicks in the National Basketball Association (NBA). He played three seasons with the Knicks from 1979 through 1982. Demic played college basketball for the Arizona Wildcats, where he was an All-Pac-10 first team selection in 1979. He was drafted in the 1979 NBA draft in the first round with the ninth overall pick by New York.

In 1983, he played for the Crispa Redmanizers in the Open Conference of the Philippine Basketball Association, teaming up with the legendary Billy Ray Bates to win the championship and the coveted Grand Slam for the Redmanizers.

References

External links

1957 births
Living people
20th-century African-American sportspeople
21st-century African-American people
African-American basketball players
American expatriate basketball people in the Philippines
American men's basketball players
Arizona Wildcats men's basketball players
Basketball players from Gary, Indiana
Centers (basketball)
Crispa Redmanizers players
Detroit Spirits players
New York Knicks players
Philippine Basketball Association imports
Power forwards (basketball)